Jaana Jokela (also known as Jaana Häkkinen) is a Finnish curler and curling coach.

At the national level, she is an eight-time Finnish women's champion curler (1995, 1996, 1997, 1998, 1999, 2000, 2001, 2002).

At the international level, she was a long-time skip of the Finnish national women's team, competing in nine  and fifteen .

She is the only women's curler to have been awarded the Frances Brodie Award twice (1993, 1997).

Teams

Record as a coach of national teams

References

External links

Living people

Finnish female curlers
Finnish curling champions
Finnish curling coaches
Year of birth missing (living people)
Place of birth missing (living people)